Francesco Ruviali (mid-16th century) was an Italian painter of the Renaissance period.

Also known as Il Polidorino due to his attachment to the style of Polidoro da Caravaggio. His life was noted by Bernardo de' Dominici, the biographer of Neapolitan artists, where Ruviali, a native of Spain, was brought up and where he flourished about the year 1540. Ruviali fled to Naples after the Sack of Rome (1527).  His principal works at Naples are a Dead Christ, with the Virgin Mary and St. John in the chapel of the Courts of Justice; and the Descent from the Cross painted for the Castel Capuano.

References

16th-century Italian painters
Italian male painters
Painters from Naples
Italian Renaissance painters
Year of death unknown
Year of birth unknown